Doc Willing may refer to:
 George M. Willing (c.1829–1874), American physician, prospector, and political lobbyist.
 Oscar Willing (1889–1962), American amateur golfer